Senator Bolling may refer to:

Bill Bolling (born 1957), Virginia State Senate
Royal L. Bolling (1920–2002), Massachusetts State Senate